The Italian Anti-Bolshevik Front (abbreviated FAI) was a political organization Sicily, one of several fascist groups that surged in Italy in the years following the end of the Second World War. The organization was led by Franz Navarra Viggiani. The organization contested the 1948 parliamentary election in the Palermo-Trapani-Agrigento-Caltanissetta constituency. It obtained 2,756 votes (0.26% of the votes in the constituency).

References

Defunct political parties in Italy
Defunct nationalist parties in Italy
Neo-fascist parties